Whaley is a surname. Notable people with the surname include:

Bill Whaley (1899–1943), American baseball player
Davyd Whaley, American painter
Doug Whaley (born 1972), American football executive 
Eddie Whaley (1877–1960), American-born comic entertainer in Britain
Frank Whaley (born 1963), American actor
George Whaley, Irish politician
George Whaley (actor), Australian actor and director
Henry H. Whaley, American mayor
Janice Whaley, American musician
John Corey Whaley (born 1984), American writer
Kellian Whaley (1821–1876), American politician
Lindsay J. Whaley, American linguist
Michael Whaley, American actor
Nan Whaley, mayor of Dayton, Ohio
Paul Whaley, American rock drummer
Richard S. Whaley (1874–1951), American politician
Robert Whaley (born 1982), American basketball player
Robert H. Whaley (born 1943), American judge
Robert J C Whaley, American banker
Ross S. Whaley, American forester
Ruth Whitehead Whaley, American lawyer
Simon Whaley (born 1985), English footballer
Suzy Whaley, American golfer
Thomas Whaley (1823–1890), American settler
Thomas Whaley (politician) (1766–1800), Irish politician

See also
 Waley
 Whale (surname)
 Whaler (surname)

fr:Whaley